Staniša Nikolić (born 28 November 1980) is a retired Bosnian-Herzegovinian football defender, who spent the latter years of his career in the Austrian amateur leagues.

Club career
The right back from Tuzla has played most of his career in his home town club FK Sloboda Tuzla. In 2002, he moved to Croatia and played with NK Osijek one season before returning to Sloboda. His next experience abroad was with Serbian FK Vojvodina but after a half season he was back. In summer 2006 he moved to another Bosnian top league club, HŠK Zrinjski Mostar where he played solid three seasons which made him a move in June 2009, to Slovakia to play with ambitious FK DAC 1904 Dunajská Streda in the 2009–10 Slovak Superliga. He still played one match in Slovak league in the 2010-11 season before returning to FK Sloboda Tuzla to finish the season with 14 matches in the 2010–11 Premier League of Bosnia and Herzegovina.

International career
Staniša Nikolić made his debut for Bosnia and Herzegovina in a January 2008 friendly match away against Japan and has earned a total of 2 caps, scoring no goals. His second and final international was a June 2008 friendly against Azerbaijan.

References

External links

Staniša Nikolić at ÖFB

1980 births
Living people
Sportspeople from Tuzla
Association football defenders
Bosnia and Herzegovina footballers
Bosnia and Herzegovina international footballers
FK Sloboda Tuzla players
NK Osijek players
FK Vojvodina players
HŠK Zrinjski Mostar players
FC DAC 1904 Dunajská Streda players
First Vienna FC players
Premier League of Bosnia and Herzegovina players
Croatian Football League players
Slovak Super Liga players
2. Liga (Austria) players
Austrian Regionalliga players
Austrian Landesliga players
Austrian 2. Landesliga players
Bosnia and Herzegovina expatriate footballers
Expatriate footballers in Slovakia
Bosnia and Herzegovina expatriate sportspeople in Slovakia
Expatriate footballers in Austria
Bosnia and Herzegovina expatriate sportspeople in Austria
Expatriate footballers in Croatia
Bosnia and Herzegovina expatriate sportspeople in Croatia